2023 in sailing describes the year's events in sailing.

World championships

Pinnacle Oceanic Races
 2023 The Ocean Race
 2023 Route du Rhum

Pinnacle Offshore Race
 RORC Carribean 600
 Fastnet Race
 Sydney to Hobart

References

External links
Sailing.org Calendar

 
Sailing by year
Sailing